Fred Bostick (November 19, 1895 – January 17, 1965) was an American baseball left fielder in the Negro leagues. He played with the Milwaukee Bears in 1923 and the St. Louis Giants in 1924.

References

External links
 and Baseball-Reference Black Baseball stats and Seamheads

Milwaukee Bears players
St. Louis Giants (1924) players
1895 births
1965 deaths
Baseball players from Missouri
People from St. Louis
Baseball outfielders
20th-century African-American sportspeople